3-Methoxytyramine (3-MT), also known as 3-methoxy-4-hydroxyphenethylamine, is a human trace amine that occurs as a metabolite of the neurotransmitter dopamine.  It is formed by the introduction of a methyl group to dopamine by the enzyme catechol-O-methyl transferase (COMT). 3-MT can be further metabolized by the enzyme monoamine oxidase (MAO) to form homovanillic acid (HVA), which is then typically excreted in the urine.

Originally thought to be physiologically inactive, 3-MT has recently been shown to act as an agonist of human TAAR1.

Occurrence 
3-Methoxytyramine occurs naturally in the prickly pear cactus (genus Opuntia), and is in general widespread throughout the Cactaceae. It has also been found in crown gall tumors on Nicotiana sp.

In humans, 3-methoxytyramine is a trace amine that occurs as a metabolite of dopamine.

See also 
 Tyramine
 3,4-Dimethoxyphenethylamine

References 

Phenethylamines
Phenethylamine alkaloids
Phenols
TAAR1 agonists
Trace amines
Psychedelic phenethylamine carriers